The New Zealand Rocketry Association is a model rocketry organisation based in Auckland, New Zealand. The NZRA holds launches and meetings bi-monthly at its Taupiri launch site, an hour south of Auckland, and has an annual launch day. Launch clearance from the Civil Aviation Authority is required for all launches, to ensure there are no aircraft flying through the area.

Martin Aspell and Joel Schiff hold the current NZ altitude record of

References

External links
NZRA website

Clubs and societies in New Zealand
Model rocketry